The Diocese of Lincoln forms part of the Province of Canterbury in England.  The present diocese covers the ceremonial county of Lincolnshire.

History 

The diocese traces its roots in an unbroken line to the Pre-Reformation Diocese of Leicester, founded in 679. The see of Leicester was translated to Dorchester in the late 9th century, before taking in the territory of the Diocese of Lindsey and being translated to Lincoln. The diocese was then the largest in England, extending from the River Thames to the Humber Estuary. In 1072, Remigius de Fécamp, bishop under William the Conqueror, moved the see to Lincoln, although the Bishops of Lincoln retained significant landholdings within Oxfordshire. Because of this historic link, for a long time Banbury remained a peculiar of the Bishop of Lincoln. The modern diocese remains notoriously extensive, having been reportedly referred to by Bob Hardy, Bishop of Lincoln, as "2,000 square miles of bugger all" in 2002.

The dioceses of Oxford and Peterborough were created in 1541 out of parts of the diocese, which left the diocese with two disconnected fragments, north and south.  In 1837 the southern part was transferred to other dioceses:  Bedfordshire and Huntingdonshire to the Diocese of Ely, Hertfordshire to the Diocese of Rochester and Buckinghamshire to the Diocese of Oxford.  Also in 1837, the county of Leicestershire was transferred from Lincoln to Peterborough (and became the independent Diocese of Leicester in 1927). The Archdeaconry of Nottingham was transferred to the Lincoln diocese at the same time.

In 1884, the Archdeaconry of Nottingham was detached to form a part of the new Diocese of Southwell.

Organisation

Bishops
By virtue of the 2009 scheme of delegation, whilst the Bishop of Lincoln exercises general oversight, the Bishops of Grimsby and of Grantham were seen as leaders in mission in the north and south of the Diocese respectively until that scheme lapsed upon the 6 April 2013 retirement of the Bishop of Grimsby, which was followed by a review of roles of bishops in the diocese. The suffragan See of Grantham was created in 1905, and the See of Grimsby in 1935. It would seem that the decision to not fill the suffragan see of Grantham was taken at some point, but later reversed.

Alternative episcopal oversight (for parishes in the diocese which reject the ministry of priests who are women) is provided by the provincial episcopal visitor, Norman Banks, Bishop suffragan of Richborough, who is licensed as an honorary assistant bishop of the diocese in order to facilitate his work there. There are also three retired bishops living in the diocese who are licensed as honorary assistant bishops:
2019–present: Rob Gillion, interim Priest-in-Charge, St John the Baptist, Spalding and former Bishop of Riverina (New South Wales)
2001–present: David Tustin, former Bishop suffragan of Grimsby, lives in Wrawby.
2013–present: Another retired area Bishop of Grimsby, David Rossdale, lives in East Keal.
2013–present: Tim Ellis, retired area Bishop of Grantham, lives in Intake, Sheffield.

Archdeaconries
The diocese is divided into three archdeaconries and 22 deaneries. On 22 April 2013, it was announced that a third archdeacon had been appointed pending a pastoral reorganisation. The changes to the archdeaconries enacted by the resulting pastoral scheme were announced on 15 November:

Archdeaconry of Lincoln (established 11th century): Bolingbroke; Calcewaithe and Candleshoe; Christianity; Graffoe; Horncastle; Lafford; Louthesk
Archdeaconry of Stow and Lindsey (established 11th century): Isle of Axholme; Corringham; Grimsby and Cleethorpes; Haverstoe; Lawres; Manlake; West Wold; Yarborough
Archdeaconry of Boston (established 2013): (Aveland and Ness with) Stamford; Beltisloe; Elloe East; Elloe West; Grantham; Holland; Loveden

The diocese produces a bi-monthly newspaper, Crosslincs.

See also
Bishops of Lincoln
Suffragan Bishop of Grimsby
Lincoln Cathedral
Prebendaries of Aylesbury - The prebend of Aylesbury was attached to the See of Lincoln as early as 1092

References
Church of England Statistics 2002

External links

Diocese of Lincoln Crosslincs magazine

 
Dioceses of the Church of England
Dorchester
Dorchester
Dioceses established in the 7th century
 
7th-century establishments in England